Anselmo Ramon Alves Herculano (born 23 June 1988), known as Anselmo Ramon, is a Brazilian footballer who plays as a striker for CRB.

Honours
Cruzeiro
Campeonato Brasileiro Série A: 2013

Guarani
Campeonato Paulista Série A2: 2018

Chapecoense
Campeonato Catarinense: 2020
Campeonato Brasileiro Série B: 2020

References

External links

1988 births
Living people
Brazilian footballers
Cruzeiro Esporte Clube players
Esporte Clube Bahia players
Esporte Clube Itaúna players
Avaí FC players
Rio Branco Esporte Clube players
Oeste Futebol Clube players
Guarani FC players
Esporte Clube Vitória players
Kashiwa Reysol players
J1 League players
Liga I players
CFR Cluj players
Brazilian expatriate footballers
Expatriate footballers in Japan
Expatriate footballers in Romania
Campeonato Brasileiro Série A players
Campeonato Brasileiro Série B players
Expatriate footballers in China
Zhejiang Professional F.C. players
Brazilian expatriate sportspeople in China
Chinese Super League players
China League One players
Association football forwards
Associação Chapecoense de Futebol players
Clube de Regatas Brasil players
People from Camaçari
Sportspeople from Bahia